The Uruguay national basketball team (Spanish: Selección de baloncesto de Uruguay) represents Uruguay in men's international basketball competitions and it is governed by Federación Uruguaya de basketball, The team has made seven appearances in the FIBA World Cup and the team represents FIBA and FIBA Americas.

Uruguay is one of three South American countries to win medals at the Basketball Tournament of the Summer Olympics. It won the bronze medal in both the 1952 and 1956 Summer Olympics. Uruguay is currently ranked 40th in the FIBA World Rankings.

Competitive record

Olympic Games
 1936: 6th
 1948: 5th
 1952: 3rd
 1956: 3rd
 1960: 8th
 1964: 8th
 1984: 6th

FIBA World Cup
 1954 FIBA World Championship: 6th
 1959 FIBA World Championship: 9th
 1963 FIBA World Championship: 10th
 1967 FIBA World Championship: 7th
 1970 FIBA World Championship: 7th
 1982 FIBA World Championship: 11th
 1986 FIBA World Championship: 18th
 1990 FIBA World Championship to 2023 FIBA Basketball World Cup: Did not qualify

FIBA AmeriCup
 1980 Tournament of the Americas: 7th
 1984 Tournament of the Americas: 2nd  
 1988 Tournament of the Americas: 4th
 1992 Tournament of the Americas: 10th
 1993 Tournament of the Americas: 10th
 1995 Tournament of the Americas: 6th
 1997 Tournament of the Americas: 8th
 1999 Tournament of the Americas: 8th
 2001 Tournament of the Americas: 8th
 2003 Tournament of the Americas: 9th
 2005 FIBA Americas Championship: 8th
 2007 FIBA Americas Championship: 6th
 2009 FIBA Americas Championship: 6th
 2011 FIBA Americas Championship: 7th
 2013 FIBA Americas Championship: 7th
 2015 FIBA Americas Championship: 8th
 2017 FIBA AmeriCup: 6th
 2022 FIBA AmeriCup: 10th

Pan American Games
 1963: 4th
 1987: 7th
 1991: 8th
 1995: 4th
 1999: 8th
 2003: 8th
 2007: 3rd 
 2011: 8th
 2019: 6th

FIBA South American Championship
Uruguay was the host and champion of the first major continental basketball championship, the South American Basketball Championship 1930.  The event was held in Montevideo and featured four South American national basketball teams.  Teams played each of the other three teams twice each; Uruguay won all six of its games.  In 1932, Uruguay lost its first game of the South American Basketball Championship series when it was defeated by Chile in one of the two matches it played against the Chileans in the preliminary round.  When each team finished at 3–1 (each having defeated Argentina twice), the two countries played a third match to determine the champion, which Uruguay won.

The 1934 and 1935 competitions did not end so happily for the Uruguay team, as they finished in last place each year.  With the larger fields of 5 teams each year in 1937, 1938, and 1939, Uruguay fared somewhat better.  They took second place in 1937 and 1939, and third in 1938.

Uruguay won their third championship in 1940, which saw the return of the series to Montevideo.  There were a record six teams in competition that year; Uruguay beat each of the other five in turn to finish undefeated. 1941 resulted in a bronze medal for Uruguay.  The team played in their second tie-breaker final in 1942, this time losing to Argentina to take second place in the tournament.  Uruguay advanced to the final round in the first two-round tournament, in 1943, finishing in second place overall.

Uruguay has won the South American Championship 11 times, the last two in 1995 and 1997. The team ranked in the top four in all editions as of 2016.

Team

Current roster
The roster for the 2022 FIBA AmeriCup.

Depth chart

Head coach position

Past rosters
Scroll down to see more.
1936 Olympic Games: finished 6th among 21 teams
Héctor González, Alberto Martí, Amílcar Mesa, Rodolfo Braselli, Carlos Gabin, Leandro Gómez, Gregorio Agos, Tabaré Quintans, Humberto Bernasconi, Prudencio de Pena, Alejo González Roig, Víctor Latou (Coach: Juan Collazo)

1948 Olympic Games: finished 5th among 23 teams
Martín Acosta y Lara, Nelson Demarco, Héctor García Otero, Adesio Lombardo, Héctor Ruiz, Roberto Lovera, Carlos Rosello, Miguel Diab, Eduardo Folle, Abraham Eidlin Grossman, Gustavo Magarinos, Victorio Cieslinskas, Néstor Anton, Eduardo Gordon (Coach: Raúl Canale)

1952 Olympic Games: finished 3rd among 23 teams
Martín Acosta y Lara, Héctor García Otero, Adesio Lombardo, Roberto Lovera, Sergio Matto, Wilfredo Peláez, Carlos Rossello, Victorio Cieslinskas, Héctor Costa, Nelson Demarco, Enrique Balino, Tabaré Larre Borges

1954 World Championship: finished 6th among 12 teams
Oscar Moglia, Martín Acosta y Lara, Héctor García Otero, Roberto Lovera, Nelson Demarco, Adesio Lombardo, Carlos Rosello, Omar Zubillaga, Héctor Costa, Raúl Mera, Manuel Usher Ferrer, Julio César Gully, Sergio Matto, Enrique Balino (Coach: Prudencio de Pena)

1956 Olympic Games: finished 3rd among 15 teams
Oscar Moglia, Héctor García Otero, Carlos Blixen, Nelson Demarco, Raúl Mera, Héctor Costa, Ariel Olascoaga, Milton Scaron, Sergio Matto, Nelson Chelle, Carlos Gonzáles, Ramiro Cortés (Coach: Héctor López Reboledo)

1959 World Championship: finished 9th among 13 teams
Héctor García Otero, Carlos Blixen, Milton Scaron, Washington Poyet, Ramiro Cortés, Sergio Matto, Nelson Chelle, Raúl Mera, Manuel Usher Ferrer, Álvaro Roca, Octavio Pedragosa, Adolfo Lubnicki (Coach: Olguiz Rodríguez)

1960 Olympic Games: finished 8th among 16 teams
Carlos Blixen, Washington Poyet, Milton Scaron, Héctor Costa, Raúl Mera, Nelson Chelle, Sergio Matto, Adolfo Lubnicki, Manuel Gadea, Edison Ciavattone, Waldemar Rial, Danilo Coito (Coach: Héctor López Reboledo)

1963 World Championship: finished 10th among 13 teams
Carlos Blixen, Ramiro de León, Julio Gómez, Sergio Pisano, Manuel Gadea, Álvaro Roca, Waldemar Rial, Atilio Caneiro, Edison Ciavattone, Oscar Ledesma, Francisco di Matteo, Walter Márquez (Coach: Dante Méndez)

1964 Olympic Games: finished 8th among 16 teams
Washington Poyet, Julio Gómez, Edison Ciavattone, Álvaro Roca, Manuel Gadea, Ramiro de León, Sergio Pisano, Luis García, Waldemar Rial, Jorge Maya, Walter Márquez, Luis Koster (Coach: Raúl Ballefin)

1967 World Championship: finished 7th among 13 teams
Oscar Moglia, Washington Poyet, Julio Gómez, Víctor Hernández, Omar Arrestia, Sergio Pisano, Ramiro de León, Luis García, Walter Márquez, Manuel Gadea, Daniel Borroni, Juan Ceriani (Coach: Raúl Ballefin)

1970 World Championship: finished 7th among 13 teams
Omar Arrestia, Sergio Pisano, Manuel Gadea, Víctor Hernández, Ramiro de León, Luis García, Daniel Borroni, Valentín Rodríguez, José Barizo, Daniel Vannet, Walter Lage, Roberto Bomio (Coach: Héctor Bassaiztegui)

1982 World Championship: finished 11th among 13 teams
Wilfredo Ruiz, Álvaro Tito, Walter Pagani, Víctor Frattini, Horacio Perdomo, Carlos Peinado, Gerardo Jauri, Germán Haller, Mario Viola, Luis Larrosa, Luis Pierri, Hebert Núñez (Coach: Ramón Etchamendi)

1984 Olympic Games: finished 6th among 12 teams
Wilfredo Ruiz, Horacio López, Álvaro Tito, Víctor Frattini, Walter Pagani, Juan Mignone, Horacio Perdomo, Carlos Peinado, Luis Pierri, Hebert Núñez, Luis Larrosa, Julio Pereyra (Coach: Ramón Etchamendi)

1986 World Championship: finished 18th among 24 teams
Horacio López, Ramiro Cortés, Álvaro Tito, Joe McCall, Juan Mignone, Horacio Perdomo, Gabriel Waiter, Luis Larrosa, Luis Pierri, Carlos Peinado, Hebert Núñez, Gustavo Sczygielski. (Coach: Ramón Etchamendi)

1991 Pan American Games: finished 7th among 10 teams
Alejandro Costa, Juan Blanc, Marcelo Capalbo, Jeffrey Granger, Gustavo Sczygielski, Javier Guerra, Luis Larrosa, Hebert Núñez, Horacio Perdomo, Álvaro Tito, Daniel Koster, and Enrique Tucuna. Head Coach: Javier Espíndola

1995 Pan American Games: finished 4th among 6 teams
Marcel Bouzout, Gonzalo Caneiro, Marcelo Capalbo, Federico Garcín, Jeffrey Granger, Adrián Laborda, Diego Losada, Alain Mayor, Oscar Moglia Jr., Gustavo Sczygielski, Luis Silveira, and Luis Pierri

1999 Pan American Games: finished 8th among 8 teams
Adrián Bertolini, Marcel Bouzout, Bruno Abratansky, Jorge Cabrera, Diego Castrillón, Diego Losada, Nicolás Mazzarino, Oscar Moglia Jr., Pablo Morales, Luis Silveira, Martín Suárez, and Hugo Vázquez

2003 Pan American Games: finished 8th among 8 teams
Mauricio Aguiar, Esteban Batista, Leandro García Morales, Sebastián Leguizamón, Nicolás Mazzarino, Alejandro Muro, Trelonnie Owens, Gastón Paez, Alejandro Pérez, Luis Silveira, Gustavo Szczgielsky, and Emiliano Taboada

2007 Pan American Games: finished 3rd among 8 teams
Emilio Taboada, Mauricio Aguiar, Leandro García Morales, Esteban Batista, Gastón Paez, Nicolás Mazzarino, Fernando Martínez, Panchi Barrera, Claudio Charquero, Martín Osimani, Juan Pablo Silveira, and Sebastián Izaguirre

FIBA Americas Championship 2009: finished 6th among 10 teams
Sebastián Izaguirre, Panchi Barrera, Mauricio Aguiar, Emilio Taboada, Diego González, Reque Newsome, Leandro García Morales, Martín Osimani, Gastón Páez, Juan Pablo Silveira, Nicolás Borsellino, and Esteban Batista

South American Basketball Championship 2010: finished 3rd among 8 teams
Bruno Fitipaldo, Fernando Martínez, Martín Osimani, Joaquín Izuibejeres, Joaquín Osimani, Iván Loriente, Mauricio Aguiar, Mathías Calfani, Reque Newsome, Esteban Batista, Gastón Páez, and Sebastián Izaguirre

FIBA Americas Championship 2013: finished 7th among 10 teams
Esteban Batista, Frederico Bavosi, Marcos Cabot, Mathias Calfani, Bruno Fitipaldo, Leandro Garcia Morales, Sebastian Izaguirre, Nicolás Mazzarino, Reque Newsome, Emilito Taboada, Sebastián Vázquez, and Kiril Wachsmann

Roster for the 2015 FIBA Americas Championship.

At the 2016 South American Basketball Championship:

See also
Uruguay women's national basketball team
Uruguay national under-19 basketball team
Uruguay national under-17 basketball team
Uruguay national 3x3 team

References

External links

Official website
FIBA Profile

Videos
Argentina v Uruguay - Game Highlights - Second Round - 2015 FIBA Americas Championship - Youtube.com video

 
1936 establishments in Uruguay